The Eurovision Song Contest 1998 was the 43rd edition of the annual Eurovision Song Contest, held on 9 May 1998 at the National Indoor Arena in Birmingham, United Kingdom.

Twenty-five countries participated in the contest.

Dana International was the contest's first openly transgender participant and became the contest's first openly LGBTQ+ winning artist; however, her participation for Israel was controversial among sections of Israeli society and resulted in opposition and death threats against her in the run-up to the contest.

It was the first contest in which the results were determined predominantly through televoting, and would become the last contest in which all participants were required to perform in the language of their country and the last to feature an orchestra and live music accompaniment for the competing entries.

Location 

The selected venue was the National Indoor Arena, a sporting venue and indoor arena opened in 1991 which prior to the contest had previously hosted the 1993 IBF Badminton World Championships and 1995 World Netball Championships, as well as being the principal venue for the recording of UK television programme Gladiators.

Many cities across the United Kingdom expressed interest in hosting the contest, the first to be held in the country in sixteen years, with venues in Aberdeen, Belfast, Bournemouth, Brighton, Birmingham, Cardiff, Edinburgh, Glasgow, Harrogate, Inverness, Liverpool, London, Manchester, Newcastle and Sheffield being considered. Following visits by the production team to each city, Belfast, Birmingham, Cardiff, Glasgow, London and Manchester were shortlisted as potential host cities, and Birmingham's National Indoor Arena was subsequently announced as the host venue on 8 August 1997.

Production
The Eurovision Song Contest 1998 was produced by the British public broadcaster British Broadcasting Corporation (BBC). Kevin Bishop served as executive producer, Guy Freeman served as producer, Geoff Posner served as director, Andrew Howe-Davies served as designer, and Martin Koch served as musical director, leading the 60-piece BBC Concert Orchestra and arranging and orchestrating the music for the opening and closing sequences and the interval act.

Construction within the National Indoor Arena began on 19 April 1998 to build out the stage and orchestral area for the contest, as well as creating space for the green room, the dressing rooms, the press centre and accreditation area, and small rooms for use by each country's individual commentators. Although the arena could hold up to 13,000 people, the assembled audience during the contest was limited to around 4,500, with tickets for the dress rehearsal and live show awarded by ballot. The contest organisers also engaged with fan groups, and tickets in the front rows of the arena were distributed among these groups for the first time.

The green room was situated behind the stage, and was designed to resemble a nightclub. The arena featured three large video screens to enable the audience to follow the voting, and video walls were also constructed for use on stage, in the press centre and the green room. A 400-seat auditorium for press conferences and 38 booths for journalists equipped with phone lines were installed within the press centre, and 40 commentary boxes were constructed in the arena to accommodate the teams from the various broadcasters, with 28 built for television and 12 for radio. Much of the press centre facilities constructed for the contest were subsequently retained and augmented for use during the 24th G8 summit held in Birmingham the following week.

Orchestral rehearsals and rehearsals of the main elements of the interval act took place on 2 and 3 May, with rehearsals for the competing countries beginning on 4 May. The first rehearsals for each country, lasting 40 minutes in total followed by a 20 minute press conference, took place on 4 and 5 May, with second rehearsals for each country taking place on 6 and 7 May and lasting 30 minutes. Three dress rehearsals were held on 8 and 9 May, with an audience in attendance during the evening dress rehearsal on 8 May, which was also recorded for use in case of problems during the live contest that resulted in the broadcast being suspended. Stand-in studios were also prepared in Studio 4 of BBC Television Centre, London and in the Pebble Mill Studios in Birmingham in case of an emergency at the National Indoor Arena that resulted in evacuation.

Presenters

Television presenter and model Ulrika Jonsson and television and radio presenter Terry Wogan were the presenters of the 1998 contest. Wogan had previously provided television and radio commentary on the BBC since 1971, and performed this role once again for the contest's broadcast on BBC One from a separate commentary booth erected behind the stage in addition to his role as the contest presenter.

The draw to the determine the running order, held on 13 November 1997 in the National Indoor Arena, was compered by Wogan and Katrina Leskanich, lead vocalist of the 1997 contest winners Katrina and the Waves.

Opening and interval acts

The contest began with a video entitled "Birmingham, Old and New", which presented overlapping images of Birmingham in 1998 with archive footage of the city, including shots of Brindleyplace and boats on the city's canal network, to music from the BBC Concert Orchestra. A fanfare from the trumpeters of the Life Guards greeted the contest's presenters as they entered the stage. Also featured during the opening section of the broadcast was a summary video of the  1960 contest, the first to be held in the United Kingdom, with that year's presenter Katie Boylethe only individual to host four contestsin attendance as a special guest.

The interval performance was entitled "Jupiter, The Bringer of Jollity", based on music from the movement of the same name from the orchestral suite The Planets by English composer Gustav Holst. A medley of vocal and instrumental pieces inspired by English, Scottish, Welsh, Irish, Indian and Zulu cultures, the segment included over 200 performers and featured music from the BBC Concert Orchestra and performances by soprano Lesley Garrett, violinist Vanessa-Mae, the Sutherland Pipe Band, Andrew Findon on tin whistle, Carys Hughes on harp, the bhangra dance group Nachda Sansaar, the Canoldir Male Voice Choir, the Grimethorpe Colliery Band, trumpeters from the Band of the Blues and Royals and an excerpt of Patti Boulaye's Sun Dance.

Trophy
The trophy awarded to the writers of the winning song was designed by Anongkarat Unyawong, a student at the Birmingham School of Jewellery, who had won a competition conducted at the school for the occasion. The winning performers received a glass bowl designed by Susan Nickson bearing the Eurovision Song Contest 1998 logo. The winners were heralded by the trumpeters of the Life Guards as they entered the stage, and the awards were presented by Katrina Leskanich.

Format
The rules of the Eurovision Song Contest 1998 were published in November 1997. The document set out the overall aim of the contest and provided detail on the organisation of the event, the qualification process, the criteria for the competing songs and performers, the voting system to be used to determine the results of the contest, as well as the rights and responsibilities conferred by the European Broadcasting Union (EBU) onto the participating broadcasters.

Entries 
Each participating broadcaster submitted one song to the contest, which was required to be no longer than three minutes in duration and performed in the language, or one of the languages, of the participating country. Short quotations from another language, no more than a single phrase repeated a maximum of three times, were permitted. Each entry was able to utilise all or part of the live orchestra and could use instrumental-only backing tracks. This was the second edition of the contest in which the entire song could be performed with a backing track, following the 1997 contest; previously any backing tracks which were used could only include the sound of instruments which featured on stage being mimed by the performers. A maximum of six performers were allowed on stage during each country's performance, and all performers must have reached the age of 16 in the year of the contest.

Selected entries were not permitted to be released commercially before 1 January 1998; entries were only permitted to be released after being selected for the contest, and were then only allowed to be released in the country they represented until after the contest was held. Entries were required to be selected by each country's participating broadcaster by 15 March, and the final submission date for all selected entries to be received by the contest organisers was set for 23 March. This submission was required to include the score of the song for use by the orchestra, a sound recording of the entry and backing track for use during the contest, and the text of the song lyrics in its original language and translations in French and English for distribution to the participating broadcasters, their commentators and juries.

For the first time a watermark was included on screen during each entry with the name of the country being performed, an innovation which has become a standard feature in each contest. This edition of the contest would conversely be the last in which countries would be obliged to perform in their own language and the last to feature an orchestra accompanying the competing entries; from the following year's contest participating countries were able to send entries in any language and the organising broadcaster was no longer obliged to provide an orchestra. In subsequent years the rules would be modified again to remove the option for entries to be accompanied by live music entirely.

Voting procedure 

The results of the 1998 contest were determined through the same scoring system as had first been introduced in : each country awarded twelve points to its favourite entry, followed by ten points to its second favourite, and then awarded points in decreasing value from eight to one for the remaining songs which featured in the country's top ten, with countries unable to vote for their own entry. For the first time each participating country was required to use televoting to determine their points, with countries with weak telephone networks that prevented them from holding a large-scale televote being granted an exception. This followed a trial held in the 1997 contest where televoting was used to determine the points from five of the twenty-five competing countries. Viewers had a total of five minutes to register their vote by calling one of twenty-four different telephone numbers to represent the twenty-five competing entries except that which represented their own country, with voting lines opening following the performance of the last competing entry. Once phone lines were opened a video recap containing short clips of each competing entry with the accompanying phone number for voting was shown in order to aid viewers during the voting window. Systems were also put in place to prevent lobby groups from one country voting for their song by travelling to other countries.

The points from countries which were unable to use televoting were determined by an assembled jury of sixteen individuals, which was required to be split evenly between members of the public and music professionals, comprised additionally of an equal number of men and women, and below and above 30 years of age. In addition countries using televoting were required to appoint a back-up jury of eight members which would be called into action upon technical failure preventing the televote results from being used, with the same equal split of gender, age and occupation. Each jury member voted in secret and awarded between one and ten votes to each participating song, excluding that from their own country and with no abstentions permitted. The votes of each member were collected following the country's performance and then tallied by the non-voting jury chairperson to determine the points to be awarded. In any cases where two or more songs in the top ten received the same number of votes, a show of hands by all jury members was used to determine the final placing; if a tie still remained, the youngest jury member would have the deciding vote.

Postcards
Each entry was preceded by a video postcard which served as an introduction to the competing artists from each country, as well as providing an opportunity to showcase the running artistic theme of the event and creating a transition between entries to allow stage crew to make changes on stage. The postcards for the 1998 contest continued the theme of the opening segment, with each clip focussing on a particular themeeither an object, place or conceptand creating a juxtaposition between its older and newer versions. Each postcard was accompanied by extracts of Britpop or classical music, with a pattern featured in the final moments of the footage forming into the flag of the country which was about to perform. The various themes for each postcard, and the musical accompaniment which featured, are listed below by order of performance:

 Football; "Sight for Sore Eyes" (M People)
 Beaches; "Alright" (Supergrass)
 Aircraft; "Ordinary World" (Duran Duran)
 Leisure; The Young Person's Guide to the Orchestra (performed by the Birmingham Symphony Orchestra)
 Loch Ness; "Enchanted Highland" (APM Celtic Players)
 Jewellery; "Ain't Talkin' 'bout Dub" (Apollo 440)
 Glasgow, Scotland; "Slight Return" (The Bluetones)
 Art; "Common People" (Pulp)
 Ironworks; "Always on My Mind" (Pet Shop Boys)
 Fashion; "Mulder and Scully" (Catatonia)
 Wales; "A Design for Life" (Manic Street Preachers)
 Pubs; "Ocean Drive" (Lighthouse Family)
 London, England; "Bitter Sweet Symphony" (The Verve)
 Education; "Beautiful Ones" (Suede)
 Sailing; "Sailing" (Rod Stewart)
 Cars; "Hush" (Kula Shaker)
 Food; "Born Slippy" (Underworld)
 Broadcasting; "Polo Mint City" (Texas)
 Retail; "Don't Marry Her" (The Beautiful South)
 Theatres; "She's a Star" (James)
 Films; "The Chad Who Loved Me" (Mansun)
 Medieval; "Hail to the King" (performed by the Kneller Hall State Trumpeters)
 Belfast, Northern Ireland; "Bright Side of the Road" (Van Morrison)
 National landmarks; Symphony No. 5, III: Romanza (Ralph Vaughan Williams)
 Weather; "Sugar Coated Iceberg" (The Lightning Seeds)

Participating countries
Per the rules of the contest twenty-five countries were allowed to participate in the event.  participated in the contest for the first time, having previously applied to enter the  but failing to progress from that edition's qualifying round; due to the then-ongoing Macedonia naming dispute with Greece, the nation participated under the provisional reference "the former Yugoslav Republic of Macedonia" or its shortened form "FYR Macedonia". Italy would not return to the contest again until 2011.

Qualification 
Any relegated countries would be able to return the following year, thus allowing all countries the opportunity to compete in at least one in every two editions. The relegation rules introduced for the 1997 contest were again utilised ahead of the 1998 contest, based on each country's average points total in previous contests. The twenty-five participants were made up of the previous year's winning country and host nation, the eighteen countries which had the highest average points total over the preceding five contests, and any eligible countries which did not compete in the 1997 contest. In cases where the average was identical between two or more countries the total number of points scored in the most recent contest determined the final order.

Austria, Bosnia and Herzegovina, Denmark, Iceland and Russia were therefore excluded from participating in the 1998 contest; however, after Italy declined to participate Germany was subsequently provided a reprieve and allowed to enter. The calculations used to determine the countries relegated for the 1998 contest are outlined in the table below.

Table key

Conductors
For those countries which opted to utilise the orchestra during their performance a separate musical director could be nominated to lead the orchestra during their performance, with the host musical director, Martin Koch, also conducting for those countries which did not nominate their own conductor. The conductors listed below led the orchestra during the performance for the indicated countries.

The entries from Greece, Switzerland, Israel, Germany, Malta, Slovenia and Belgium were performed entirely without orchestration; however, in the case of Germany and Slovenia conductors for those countries were present during the contest. Stefan Raab, the writer of the German entry under the pseudonym "Alf Igel", had no intention of conducting the orchestra but insisted on taking the customary conductor's bow before the entry, while the Slovenian entry had been due to be performed with the orchestra before a change of mind by the songwriters during the rehearsals led to the full backing track being used and their conductor Mojmir Sepe instead signalling to start the track. The French entry had been planned to be performed completely with the backing track, but during rehearsals a decision was reached to incorporate additional live string accompaniment from the orchestra directed by Martin Koch.

 
 Martin Koch
 Alberto Estébanez
 Vladimír Valovič
 
 Stefan Raab
 Miklós Malek
 Mojmir Sepe
 Noel Kelehan
 Mike Sergeant
 
 James McMillan
 Costas Cacogiannis
 Dick Bakker
 Anders Berglund
 Olli Ahvenlahti
 Geir Langslet
 Heiki Vahar
 Ümit Eroğlu
 Aleksandar Džambazov

During rehearsals conflict occurred between the contest organisers and the Greek delegation, with the Greeks unhappy with the way that their entry was being presented on screen. Aggressive behaviour by the Greek composer, Yiannis Valvis, during the dress rehearsals led to his accreditation being rescinded, and on the day of the contest the Greek broadcaster Hellenic Broadcasting Corporation (ERT) withdrew from the contest, a decision which was ultimately reversed minutes later. Issues also arose during the rehearsals for the Turkish entry, when their conductor Ümit Eroğlu was found to be leading the orchestra at too slow a tempo, resulting in the performance running over the three minute limit and thus breaking the rules of the contest. Ultimately the final performance lasted two minutes and fifty-nine seconds, ensuring that Turkey could not be disqualified for exceeding the time limit during the final and would remain in the competition.

Returning artists
The contest featured four representatives who had previously performed as lead artists for the same country.

Participants and results 

The contest took place on 9 May 1998 at 20:00 (BST) and lasted 3 hours. The table below outlines the participating countries, the order in which they performed, the competing artists and songs, and the results of the voting.

Following the contest it was announced the results of the Spanish vote had been incorrectly tabulated, resulting in Germany, which should have been awarded twelve points, receiving no points at all; this subsequently had an impact on the remaining countries which were awarded points by Spain. The tables in this article present the corrected results as published by the EBU.

Dana International, the contest's first openly transgender participant, also became the first openly LGBTQ+ and first openly transgender artist to win the event.

The selection of Dana International as the Israeli representative for the contest by the Israel Broadcasting Authority (IBA) created uproar among members of the Orthodox Jewish community in Israel. Taking issue with the singer's transgender status, groups mounted street protests against her selection, and she also received death threats ahead of the contest. Her selection was also opposed by politicial figures, with deputy minister Shlomo Benizri demanding her removal, referring to the singer as "an abomination" and her selection as "sending a message of darkness". On arriving at the contest Dana International was accommodated in the Hyatt Regency Birmingham, the only hotel in Birmingham with bulletproof windows, and was accompanied in public by armed guards.

Following her victory Dana International also caused a delay in the production when, following the conclusion of the voting, she changed outfits into one specially designed for the contest by Jean Paul Gaultier but which was ultimately not used for the original performance. This led to scenes towards the end of the broadcast of hosts Terry Wogan and Ulrika Jonsson, and last year's winning vocalist Katrina Leskanich, looking perturbed and confused as to the delay and location of Dana International.

"Diva" was subsequently nominated in 2005 to compete in Congratulations: 50 Years of the Eurovision Song Contest, a special broadcast to determine the contest's most popular entry of its first 50 years as part of the contest's anniversary celebrations. One of 14 entries chosen to competethe only song from the 1990s on the list"Diva" ultimately finished in thirteenth place.

Detailed voting results 

Televoting was used to determine the points awarded by all countries, except Hungary, Romania and Turkey. The announcement of the results from each country was conducted in the order in which they performed, with the spokespersons announcing their country's points in English or French in ascending order. The detailed breakdown of the points awarded by each country is listed in the tables below.

12 points
The below table summarises how the maximum 12 points were awarded from one country to another. The winning country is shown in bold.

Spokespersons 
Each country nominated a spokesperson who was responsible for announcing, in English or French, the votes for their respective country. Spokespersons at the 1998 contest are listed below.

During the voting procedure Ulrika Jonsson had an unplanned comical moment with the Dutch spokesperson Conny Vandenbos; after Vandenbos had expressed her sympathy with the performers in the contesthaving previously represented the Netherlands in she added that "it's long ago". This comment was not heard by the audience in the arena due to noise, but Jonsson's reply, "a long time ago, was it?" was, leading to a reaction from the crowd due to the perceived rudeness of the remark out of context.

 
 
 Marie Myriam
 Belén Fernández de Henestrosa
 Regula Elsener
 
 Jan Chojnacki
 Yigal Ravid
 Nena
 Stephanie Spiteri
 
 
 Eileen Dunne
 Lúcia Moniz
 
 Ken Bruce
 Marina Maleni
 Conny Vandenbos
 Björn Hedman
 Marie-Hélène Vanderborght
 Marjo Wilska
 Ragnhild Sælthun Fjørtoft
 Urve Tiidus
 Osman Erkan
 Evgenija Teodosievska

Broadcasts 

Each participating broadcaster was required to relay live and in full the contest via television. Non-participating EBU member broadcasters were also able to relay the contest as "passive participants"; any passive countries wishing to participate in the following year's event were also required to provide a live broadcast of the contest or a deferred broadcast within 24 hours. Broadcasters were able to send commentators to provide coverage of the contest in their own native language and to relay information about the artists and songs to their viewers.

The 1998 contest was transmitted to 33 European countries, as well as to Australia, Canada and South Korea. Known details on the broadcasts in each country, including the specific broadcasting stations and commentators, are shown in the tables below.

Other awards

Barbara Dex Award
The Barbara Dex Award, created in 1997 by fansite House of Eurovision, was awarded to the performer deemed to have been the "worst dressed" among the participants. The winner in 1998 was Germany's representative Guildo Horn, as determined by the founders of the House of Eurovision site Edwin van Thillo and Rob Paardekam.

Notes and references

Notes

References

Bibliography

External links

 

 
1998
1998 in music
1998 in British music
May 1998 events in the United Kingdom
1998 in England
1990s in Birmingham, West Midlands
1998 in British television
Events in Birmingham, West Midlands
Festivals in Birmingham, West Midlands
Music in Birmingham, West Midlands
Music festivals in the United Kingdom